Niels Vets (born 19 February 1992 in Bonheiden) is a retired Belgian professional footballer who played as a centre back.

Career
Niels began his career with Lierse, and in 2012 was loaned out to KV Turnhout. After a new loan spell with Fortuna Sittard in 2013, he signed a permanent deal with the club.

Injuries restricted his playing time, and in December 2015, he signed a contract with K. Rupel Boom FC.

References

External links
 Voetbal International profile 

1992 births
Living people
Dutch footballers
Lierse S.K. players
Fortuna Sittard players
KFC Turnhout players
K. Rupel Boom F.C. players
Eerste Divisie players
People from Bonheiden
Association football defenders
Footballers from Antwerp Province